"Bingo" (also known as "Bingo Was His Name-O", "There Was a Farmer Had a Dog" or "B-I-N-G-O") is an English language children's song of obscure origin. Additional verses are sung by omitting the first letter sung in the previous verse and clapping or barking the number of times instead of actually saying each letter. Its Roud Folk Song Index number is 589.

Lyrics
The contemporary version generally goes as follows:

There was a farmer had a dog,
and Bingo was his name-o.
B-I-N-G-O
B-I-N-G-O
B-I-N-G-O
And Bingo was his name-o.

There was a farmer had a dog,
and Bingo was his name-o.
(clap)-I-N-G-O
(clap)-I-N-G-O
(clap)-I-N-G-O
And Bingo was his name-o.

There was a farmer had a dog,
and Bingo was his name-o.
(clap)-(clap)-N-G-O
(clap)-(clap)-N-G-O
(clap)-(clap)-N-G-O
And Bingo was his name-o.

There was a farmer had a dog,
and Bingo was his name-o.
(clap)-(clap)-(clap)-G-O
(clap)-(clap)-(clap)-G-O
(clap)-(clap)-(clap)-G-O
And Bingo was his name-o.

There was a farmer had a dog,
and Bingo was his name-o.
(clap)-(clap)-(clap)-(clap)-O
(clap)-(clap)-(clap)-(clap)-O
(clap)-(clap)-(clap)-(clap)-O
And Bingo was his name-o.

There was a farmer had a dog,
and Bingo was his name-o.
(clap)-(clap)-(clap)-(clap)-(clap)
(clap)-(clap)-(clap)-(clap)-(clap)
(clap)-(clap)-(clap)-(clap)-(clap)
And Bingo was his name-o.

Though the first line is ungrammatical in standard English, using an apo koinou construction, it is nearly always sung with the lyrics as stated.

Earlier forms
The earliest reference to any form of the song is from the title of a piece of sheet music published in 1780, which attributed the song to William Swords, an actor at the Haymarket Theatre of London. Early versions of the song were variously titled "The Farmer's Dog Leapt o'er the Stile," "A Franklyn's Dogge," or "Little Bingo."

An early transcription of the song (without a title) dates from the 1785 songbook "The Humming Bird," and reads: This is how most people know the traditional children's song:

The farmer's dog leapt over the stile,
his name was little Bingo,
the farmer's dog leapt over the stile,
his name was little Bingo.
B with an I — I with an N,
N with a G — G with an O;
his name was little Bingo:
B—I—N—G—O;
His name was little Bingo.

The farmer loved a cup of good ale,
he called it rare good stingo,
the farmer loved a cup of good ale,
he called it rare good stingo.
S—T with an I — I with an N,
N with a G — G with an O;
He called it rare good stingo:
S—T—I—N—G—O;
He called it rare good stingo

And is this not a sweet little song?
I think it is —— by jingo.
And is this not a sweet little song?
I think it is —— by jingo.
J with an I — I with an N,
N with a G — G with an O;
I think it is —— by jingo:
J—I—N—G—O;
I think it is —— by jingo.

A similar transcription exists from 1840, as part of The Ingoldsby Legends, the transcribing of which is credited in part to a "Mr. Simpkinson from Bath." This version drops several of the repeated lines found in the 1785 version and the transcription uses more archaic spelling and the first lines read "A franklyn's dogge" rather than "The farmer's dog." A version similar to the Ingoldsby one (with some spelling variations) was also noted from 1888.

The presence of the song in the United States was noted by Robert M. Charlton in 1842. English folklorist Alice Bertha Gomme recorded eight forms in 1894. Highly-differing versions were recorded in Monton, Shropshire, Liphook and Wakefield, Staffordshire, Nottinghamshire, Cambridgeshire, Derbyshire and Enborne. All of these versions were associated with children's games, the rules differing by locality. Early versions of "Bingo" were also noted as adult drinking songs.

Variations on the lyrics refer to the dog variously as belonging to a miller or a shepherd, and/or named "Bango" or "Pinto". In some variants, variations on the following third stanza are added:

The farmer loved a pretty young lass,
and gave her a wedding-ring-o.
R with an I — I with an N,
N with a G — G with an O;
(etc.)

This stanza is placed before or substituted for the stanza starting with "And is this not a sweet little song?"

Versions that are variations on the early version of "Bingo" have been recorded in classical arrangements by Frederick Ranalow (1925), John Langstaff (1952), and Richard Lewis (1960). Under the title "Little Bingo", a variation on the early version was recorded twice by folk singer Alan Mills, on Animals, Vol. 1 (1956) and on 14 Numbers, Letters, and Animal Songs (1972).

In popular culture
 The Cartoon Network program Camp Lazlo uses the tune for its theme song.
 In The Simpsons episode "Lisa's Sax", in Bart's kindergarten days, he sang Bingo misplacing the claps, "B-I-(clap)-(clap)-O!" The song was also in "There's No Disgrace Like Home", in a vision Homer had about his family being hell-ish and another family, who sang the song, being heavenly. The song is also played during the closing credits of this episode.
 The song changes the number of letters in the tune from the song.

References

External links
 A brief history of Bingo

Cumulative songs
English children's songs
English folk songs
Songs about dogs
Songs about farmers
Songwriter unknown
Traditional children's songs
Year of song unknown